The Best of N.W.A: The Strength of Street Knowledge is a greatest hits album by American hip hop group N.W.A. It was released on December 26, 2006 through Priority Records with a bonus DVD material (deluxe 20th anniversary edition). It contains some of their old hits and remixes, interviews and music videos. The title is a reference to the quote from the intro to "Straight Outta Compton".

Track listing

Notes
Tracks 1, 4, 7, 10. 14 and 17 are from Straight Outta Compton © 1988
Tracks 2, 5, 8, 13 and 15 are from Efil4zaggin © 1991
Tracks 3, 6, 9 and 12 are from N.W.A. and the Posse © 1987
Track 11 is from 100 Miles and Runnin' © 1990
Track 16 is from Next Friday (Original Motion Picture Soundtrack) © 1998

Sample credits
Track 7 contains a sample from "Express Yourself" written by Charles Wright as recorded by Charles Wright & the Watts 103rd Street Rhythm Band
Track 10 contains a sample from "Funky Worm" written by Leroy Bonner, Marshall Jones, Ralph Middlebrooks, Walter Morrison, Andrew Noland and Greg Webster as recorded by the Ohio Players
Track 11 contains a sample from "Nowhere to Run" written by Holland–Dozier–Holland as recorded by Martha and the Vandellas and a sample from "Hang Up Your Hang-Ups" written by Herbert Hancock, Paul Jackson and Melvin Ragin as recorded by Herbie Hancock
Track 13 contains a sample from "I Just Want to Celebrate" written by Dino Fekaris and Nick Zesses as recorded by Rare Earth

Charts

Certifications

References

External links

N.W.A albums
2006 greatest hits albums
Albums produced by Dr. Dre
Albums produced by DJ Yella
Gangsta rap compilation albums
Priority Records compilation albums